Vexillum infaustum is a species of small sea snail, marine gastropod mollusk in the family Costellariidae, the ribbed miters.

Description

Distribution

References

External links
 Reeve, L. A. (1844-1845). Monograph of the genus Mitra. In: Conchologia Iconica, or, illustrations of the shells of molluscous animals, vol. 2, pl. 1-39 and unpaginated text. L. Reeve & Co., London
 Melvill, J. C. (1888). Descriptions of fifteen new species of Mitra. Journal of Conchology. 5(9): 281-288
 W.O.Cernohorsky, The Mitridae of Fiji - The Veliger v. 8 (1965-1966)

infaustum
Gastropods described in 1845